The 1954–55 WHL season was the third season of the Western Hockey League. The Edmonton Flyers were the President's Cup champions as they beat the Calgary Stampeders in four games in the final series.

Final standings 

bold - qualified for playoffs

Playoffs 

The Edmonton Flyers win the President's Cup 4 games to 0.

All Star Team

References 

Western Hockey League (1952–1974) seasons
1954–55 in Canadian ice hockey by league